Bel Ami is a 2013–2014 South Korean romantic comedy television series starring Jang Keun-suk, Lee Ji-eun, Lee Jang-woo, and Han Chae-young. Based on the same-titled 17-volume manhwa by Chon Kye-young, it aired on KBS2 from November 20, 2013, to January 9, 2014, on Wednesdays and Thursdays at 22:00 (KST) for 16 episodes.

Synopsis
Dokgo Ma-te (Jang Keun-suk) is a pretty boy. His mother dies without giving him the password to meet his father, whom he never knew. Ma-te's mother gives it instead to Hong Yoo-ra (Han Chae-young), an ex-heiress who was once the daughter-in-law of a wealthy family. A family that she thinks Ma-te's father is the chairman of. Yoo-ra promises to give him the password if he conquers several women and learns valuable lessons from each of them so as to conquer Na Hong-ran, Yoo-ra's ex mother-in-law and the Chairman Park Ki-suk's wife, who is evil and ruthless. But then Kim Bo-tong (IU), an ordinary girl from a poor background decides to aid Ma-te in pursuing his father's heels. She has had a huge crush on him since high school and is willing to do anything to help him succeed. Despite himself, Ma-te falls for Bo-tong.
But Choi David (Lee Jang-woo), who is also the Chairman's secret son and is like the male Bo-tong, falls for her too, leading into a conflict of romance and deception.

Cast

Main
Jang Keun-suk as Dokgo Ma-te
A boy who discovered as early as kindergarten that he was prettier than most and could get special treatment because of it. During his school years he never once had to bring lunch to school, and now only has to glance at designer stuff in stores for rich women to purchase them for him. He discovers he has a wealthy father who he doesn't remember. His role within the drama is to learn different things from dating/seducing ten wealthy ladies, so that he can eventually undertake the role of meeting with his father.

Lee Ji-eun as Kim Bo-tong
An average girl from Ma-te's neighborhood who's had an unrequited crush on him since junior high. She is innocent and free hearted who is head over heels in love with Ma-te and helps him through his journey of overcoming troubles to meet his father. Her name, Bo-tong means 'average' in Hangul.

Lee Jang-woo as David Choi
A friendly, free-spirited marketing director who falls for Bo-tong and helps her out. He has a strange past too, however also changes the story with his funny and warm personality. He meets Bo-tong when she starts to sell her belongings to earn money and immediately gets attracted to her innocent charm.

Han Chae-young as Hong Yoo-ra
The glamorous, successful woman Ma-te wants but can't get. She makes a game of "training" him and tells Ma-te to seduce ten of the most eligible bachelorettes in the city first. She has had a difficult life filled with torture as she can not see her own child nor talk to her husband from the harsh rule of the wife of the chairman.

Supporting
Kim Bo-yeon as Na Hong-ran
Dokgo Young-jae as Park Ki-suk
Kim Young-jae as Park Moon-soo
So Yoo-jin as Jaek-hee
Kim Ye-won as Electric Fairy
Cha Hyun-jung as Kim In-joong
Park Ji-yoon as Myo-mi
Kim Bo-ra as Kwi-ji
Jung Sun-kyung as Yi-kim
Kim Min-joo as Yeo-mim
Yang Mi-kyung as Kim Mi-sook, Ma-te's mother
Kim Ji-han as Jang Deok-saeng
Lee Mi-young as Lee Mal-ja, Bo-tong's mother
Yeo Hoon-min as Kim Dae-shik, Bo-tong's younger brother
Ahn Byung-kyung as Na Jin-seok
Lee Do-yup as Na Hwan-kyu
Kim Seul-gi as Ma-te's high school teacher in senior year (cameo, Ep. 1)
Jo Hye-ryun as female police officer (cameo, Ep. 1)
Go Myung-hwan as MG Home Shopping organization director (cameo, Ep. 5)

Original soundtrack

Ratings
In the table below, the blue numbers represent the lowest ratings and the red numbers represent the highest ratings.

Awards and nominations

References

External links
  
 
 
 

2013 South Korean television series debuts
2014 South Korean television series endings
Korean Broadcasting System television dramas
Korean-language television shows
Television shows based on manhwa
South Korean romantic comedy television series